Herman Matinpoika "Hermanni" Pihlajamäki (11 November 1903 – 4 June 1982) was a Finnish wrestler. He competed in freestyle wrestling at the 1932 and 1936 Olympics and won a gold and a bronze medal, respectively. At the European championships he won a freestyle gold medal in 1931, and two silver medals in 1935, in freestyle and Greco-Roman wrestling.

Pihlajamäki won six Finnish titles: in 1927, 1930, 1932 and 1935–1937, five of them in freestyle wrestling. He worked as a policeman. His cousin Kustaa was also a policeman and an Olympic champion in wrestling.

References

External links
 

1903 births
1982 deaths
Olympic wrestlers of Finland
Wrestlers at the 1932 Summer Olympics
Wrestlers at the 1936 Summer Olympics
Finnish male sport wrestlers
Olympic gold medalists for Finland
Olympic medalists in wrestling
Medalists at the 1936 Summer Olympics
Medalists at the 1932 Summer Olympics
Olympic bronze medalists for Finland
European Wrestling Championships medalists
Sportspeople from South Ostrobothnia
20th-century Finnish people